, is a Japanese professional wrestler best known by his ring name  after Abdullah the Butcher, who was one of his trainers.

Professional wrestling career
He began his career in 1995 as one of the main wrestlers in Big Japan Pro Wrestling (BJW) in the Deathmatch division and has wrestled for BJW throughout most of his career. He is well known for his very brutal deathmatches with the likes of Ryuji Ito and several other BJW wrestlers. On June 26, 2010, Kobayashi made his American debut in Combat Zone Wrestling's Tournament of Death IX defeating Nick Gage in the first round but lost in the second to JC Bailey. In mid-2013, Kobayashi was diagnosed with hepatitis C, forcing him to take a long-term break from in-ring action to undergo treatment. He returned to the ring on August 10, 2014.

Other media
Kobayashi appears as himself alongside Ryuji Ito, Daisuke Sekimoto, Takashi Sasaki and Jaki Numazawa in the 2006 film Dirty Sanchez: The Movie. Kobayashi and the other wrestlers performed wrestling moves on the three main cast members, and also made a cameo appearance in the 2004 film Otōsan no Backdrop.

Championships and accomplishments
Big Japan Pro Wrestling
BJW Deathmatch Heavyweight Championship (5 times)
BJW Tag Team Championship (5 times) – with Kamikaze (1), Daikokubō Benkei (1), Jaki Numazawa (1), Daisuke Sekimoto (1) and Ryuji Ito (1)
WEW Hardcore Tag Team Championship (1 time) – with Daikokubō Benkei
Yokohama Shopping Street 6-Man Tag Team Championship (8 times) – with Jaki Numazawa and Kazuki Hashimoto (1), Masaya Takahashi and Takayuki Ueki (1), Jaki Numazawa and Ryuji Ito (1), Jaki Numazawa and Yuko Miyamoto (1), Hideki Suzuki and Yoshihisa Uto (2) and Drew Parker and Yoshihisa Uto (2)
Dainichi-X (2011) – with Yuji Okabayashi
Ikkitousen Deathmatch Survivor (2015)
Combat Zone Wrestling
CZW Death Match Championship (1 time)  
Japan Indy Grand Prix
MVP Award (2012)
Niigata Pro Wrestling
Niigata Openweight Championship (1 time)
Tokyo Sports
Fighting Spirit Award (2012)

References

External links

Japanese male professional wrestlers
1976 births
Living people
20th-century professional wrestlers
21st-century professional wrestlers
WEW Hardcore Tag Team Champions
BJW Deathmatch Heavyweight Champions
BJW Tag Team Champions
Yokohama Shopping Street 6-Man Tag Team Champions